Spozmi Achakzai is a Pakistani politician who was a Member of the Provincial Assembly of Balochistan, from May 2013 to May 2018.

Early life and education
She was born on 11 April 1964 in Quetta.

She holds the degree of the Master of Arts in Sociology and an associate degree in Sociology.

Political career
She was elected to the Provincial Assembly of Balochistan as a candidate of Pashtunkhwa Milli Awami Party (PkMAP) on a reserved seat for women in 2002 Pakistani general election.

She was re-elected to the Provincial Assembly of Balochistan as a candidate of PkMAP on a reserved seat for women in 2013 Pakistani general election.

References

Living people
Balochistan MPAs 2002–2007
Balochistan MPAs 2013–2018
1964 births